County Fair is a 1950 American drama film directed by William Beaudine and starring Rory Calhoun, Jane Nigh and Florence Bates. It was a remake of the 1932 film The County Fair, which had also been remade in 1937. A group of locals thwart the plans of a group of criminals to fix a race by doping a horse.

Plot

Cast
 Rory Calhoun as Peter Brennan  
 Jane Nigh as Loretta Ryan  
 Florence Bates as Nora 'Ma' Ryan  
 Warren Douglas as Tommy Blake  
 Raymond Hatton as Sad Sam  
 Emory Parnell as Tim Brennan  
 Rory Mallinson as Grattan 
 Harry Cheshire as Auctioneer 
 Milton Kibbee as Racing Secretary 
 Roy E. Shudt as Race Commentary

References

Bibliography
 Langman, Larry & Ebner, David. Hollywood's Image of the South: A Century of Southern Films. Greenwood Publishing, 2001.
 Marshall, Wendy L. William Beaudine: From Silents to Television. Scarecrow Press, 2005.

External links

1950 films
American sports drama films
American black-and-white films
1950s sports drama films
1950s English-language films
Films directed by William Beaudine
Films produced by Walter Mirisch
Monogram Pictures films
American horse racing films
1950 drama films
1950s American films